Les Ambassadeurs is a Tunisian film produced in 1975 by Naceur Ktari. It won the Tanit d'or for best film at Carthage Film Festival in 1976 and the special jury prize at Locarno International Film Festival the same year. It was selected for the 1978 Cannes Film Festival in the category "Un Certain Regard".

Synopsis 
In the Goutte d'Or neighborhood of Paris, North African immigrants share a tiny apartment amongst their French neighbors. The two communities get along uneasily, their relationship rife with misunderstandings and mutual offense. Salah (Sidi Ali Kouiret), from the southern Maghreb, is a witness to this immigrant life in Paris and to the day to day incidents which make up the life of his compatriots. They, excepting those willing to pursue a life of petty crime, live a life of tedium and depression. French racists in the area escalate tensions with a series of attacks that end in a double murder. Salah, with the help of his friends, decides to organise protests against the injustice they face.

Acting credits 
Sidi Ali Kouiret as Salah
Jacques Rispal as Albert
Tahar Kebaïli as Mehdi
Marcel Cuvelier as Pierre
Mohamed Hamam as Ahmed
Dominique Lacarriere as Zohra
Faouzi Kasri as Ali
Pierre Forget as Cecelle
Dynn Yaad as Kamel
Françoise Thuries as Teacher
Med Hondo as Med
Catherine Rivet as Catherine
Didane Oumer as Hedi
François Dyrek as Paul
Raoul Curet as Teacher
Gilberte Géniat as Baker
Guy Mairesse as Le guetteur
Khémaïs Khayati as Aziz
Paul Pavel as Journalist
Denise Peron as Denise
Alice Reichen as Instructor
Yves Wecker as Nicolas
Jenny Clève as Simone
Annie Noel as Josette
Omar Chouiref
Berabah Rabah
Abdellatif Hamrouni
Samir Ayedi

Production credits 
Script : Lise Bouzidi, Christine Jancovici, Ahmed Kassem, Naceur Ktari et Gérard Mauger
Director : Naceur Ktari
Editing : François Ceppi et Larbi Ben Ali
Music : Hamadi Ben Othman
Photography : Jean-Jacques Rochut
Scenery : Denis Martin Sisteron
Sound : Antoine Bonfanti, Auguste Galli et Hechmi Joulak
Format : colour (35 mm)

Producers 
Unité Trois : Alain Dahan (France)
SATPEC : Hassen Daldoul (Tunisia)
OGEK (Libya)

Recognition 
 Tanit d'or for best film Journées cinématographiques de Carthage (1976)
 Prix spécial du jury du Festival international du film de Locarno (1976)
 Sélectionné au Festival de Cannes pour "Un certain Regard" (1978)

References 

 This article incorporates a translation from French Wikipedia of :fr:Les Amabasadeurs (film), Retrieved 13 February 2008.
 Les Amabasadeurs at the New York Times.
 Roy Armes. African Filmmaking: North and South of the Sahara. Indiana University Press (2006) pp. 82–83 
 Gönül Dönmez-Colin. The Cinema of North Africa and the Middle East. Wallflower Press (2007). pp71–72

External links 
 
 

Tunisian drama films
1977 films
1977 drama films
Films set in Paris
French drama films
1970s French-language films
1970s French films